Haematomis mexicana, the Mexican lichen moth, is a moth of the family Erebidae. It was described by Herbert Druce in 1885. It is found in Mexico and Guatemala.

References

 

Cisthenina
Moths described in 1885